Peter John Hannan (born August 13, 1954) is an American producer, animator, singer-songwriter, author, illustrator, artist, and entrepreneur.

Hannan is the creator, executive producer, and showrunner of the Nickelodeon series CatDog, for which he also wrote and sang the theme song. He is currently the story editor, sometime songwriter, and interstitial producer of the animated PBS Kids series Let's Go Luna!. He has created and developed properties for numerous studios. He works as a character designer and writes for various other animated series.

He created a web series called Really Freaking Embarrassing, single-panel cartoons called The Adventures of a Huge Mouth that ran in independent newspapers throughout the U.S., and writes and illustrates books, including Petlandia, My Big Mouth: 10 Songs I Wrote That Almost Got Me Killed, The Greatest Snowman in the World, Super Goofballs, Sillyville or Bust, Escape from Camp Wannabarf, School After Dark: Lessons in Lunacy,  The Battle of Sillyville: Live Silly or Die! And Freddy! King of Flurb. He has written and illustrated newspaper and magazine pieces with titles like "The Incredible Shrinking Christmas" and "The Good, the Bad, and the Irish."
 
He co-founded the company FutureVision, which produced a TV concert series featuring blues legends Muddy Waters, Albert King, Buddy Guy & Junior Wells, Bobby Bland, Otis Rush, and Blind John Davis.

Hannan has taught, lectured, and led art, writing, animation, and creativity workshops for pre-school through college students. He has worked as a graphic designer and art director and done illustrations for magazines, newspapers, and advertising. He exhibits paintings, illustrations, and cartoons.

Works 
Rugrats - Voice of Balladeer
CatDog – Creator
Figure It Out - Writer
Pound Puppies – Writer
Let's Go Luna! – Writer

References

External links 
 
 

1954 births
American animated film producers
American television producers
American singer-songwriters
American male singer-songwriters
American animators
American male writers
American illustrators
Goddard College alumni
Living people
Nickelodeon Animation Studio people
Showrunners